Heritage Way is the fourth album from Texas singer-songwriter Phil Pritchett. The album is noted for having a more personal introspective feel to it, having Pritchett playing most of the instruments and writing all of the songs. It is comparatively more acoustic-folk based than most of Pritchett's more rock-country based albums.

Track listing
All tracks written by Phil Pritchett.
 "Summertime"– 5:09
 "Nowhere" – 3:10
 "Julianne Part II"– 3:32
 "Song For Keeps" – 4:00
 "Life of Paul" – 2:39
 "Guardian Angel" – 3:04
 "Beautiful Day" – 5:12
 "Feeling Port Aransas"– 3:34
 "Stumbling Free" – 3:28
 "Long Way Gone" – 3:21

External links 
 Austin Chronicle Review
 The Album on Lonestarmusic.com

Phil Pritchett albums
2000 albums